Vietnam's Next Top Model (Người mẫu Việt Nam, or VNTM) is a Vietnamese reality television show in which contestants compete for the title of "Vietnam's Next Top Model." Contestants are given the opportunity to begin a career in the modeling industry, and the winner receives a cash prize and a feature article in a fashion magazine.

Background
The competition follows a group of female contestants (including male contestants from season 4-7) at least 18 years old. They live together in a house for several months and take part in various challenges, such as posing for photographs. Many episodes feature contestants meeting well-known figures in the modeling industry. In each episode, one or more contestants are eliminated, although multiple eliminations or zero elimination occasionally occur by consensus of the panel of judges. The winner will be crowned "Vietnam's Next Top Model", receiving a modeling contract and other prizes.

Format

Requirements 
Contestants must be between 18 and 25 years of age, and had to be Vietnamese citizens or foreigners of Vietnamese origin. From season four women had to be at least 5'7" (170 cm) tall and men at least 5'9" (175 cm) tall in order to compete. The contestants must not be managed exclusively by companies, agencies, or products and have no criminal record. In season seven, height and age requirements are removed.

Judging 
The first cycle was overseen by two panels of judges. The first included model Nathan Lee, who was scheduled to host the season with international model Elizabeth Thủy Tiên and fashion designer Hoàng Ngân. They were replaced by Hà Anh, Huy Võ and Đức Hải immediately after they were cast.

During season two, the judging panel was renewed and increased with influential figures in the Vietnamese fashion industry. Six former judges (from two panels) were replaced by a new panel. They included makeup artist Nam Trung, fashion designer Đỗ Mạnh Cường and fashion photographer Phạm Hoài Nam. Former model Xuân Lan was the host and head judge, remaining the host of the show with the exception of season four when she was pregnant (Thanh Hằng hosted that season). After hosting season four, Thanh Hằng returned as head judge in season six. On June 4, 2017, former host of Project Runway Vietnam Trương Ngọc Ánh was announced to be the new host of the show, replacing Thanh Hằng from season eight

Asia's Next Top Model season-two judge Adam Williams has been a recurring guest judge since season four, and a permanent judge in season five. That season, Đỗ Mạnh Cường was replaced by Samuel Hoàng.

In Cycle 6 , former host Phạm Thị Thanh Hằng, who hosted Cycle 4 (the first guys-and-girls season of the show), returned to fulfill her position as head judge of the panel. Samuel Hoàng reprised his role as a judge after Cycle 5 concluded. Designer Adrian Anh Tuấn was also introduced as a new judge.

In Cycle 7, host Phạm Thị Thanh Hằng and Samuel Hoàng reprised their roles in the judging panel. Fashion designer Lý Quí Khánh and fashion stylist & Editor-in-Chief of Đẹp Magazine (where the word "Đẹp" is translated from Vietnamese, means beautiful) Hà Đỗ were introduced as new judges.

In Cycle 8, the entire panel of judges was replaced. The jury consisted of model-actress Trương Ngọc Ánh, make-up artist Nam Trung, and model Võ Hoàng Yến. Ngọc Ánh acted as the show's presenter, while Nam Trung served as the show's creative director and Hoàng Yến served as model mentor, respectively.

Cycles

Controversies

Season one 
The original panel of judges, including Nathan Lee, Elizabeth Thủy Tiên, and Hoàng Ngân, was fired because of conflicts among themselves and with the producers. A new panel was introduced; the head judge was model Hà Anh, and others included designer Huy Võ and actor-model Đức Hải. Đức Hải was primarily known for appearing in made-for-television films, and Huy Võ was reportedly a student at the Fashion Institute of Design & Merchandising.

Despite signing non-disclosure agreements, several contestants appeared on other TV shows before their elimination (suggesting they had been eliminated).
The first-season finale was reportedly taken from the fourth-season finale of Germany's Next Topmodel, and the finale's "live" photo shoot was reportedly staged.

Season two 
Although head judge Xuân Lan, Nam Trung, Phạm Hoài Nam and Đỗ Mạnh Cường were chosen for their Vietnamese fashion-industry expertise, their lack of international experience was criticized. In response to questions from VTC News about qualifications for a top model, Elite Vietnam director Thúy Nga said that most finalists' body shapes were rough and disproportionate. She said, "Being a top model in three months is unbelievable" and considered the competition as primarily entertainment.

During filming, finalists Hoàng Oanh, Thùy Dương and Phương Nghi faced a lawsuit from producers for leaking the elimination order before the final episode. The lawsuit demanded 15 billion Vietnamese đồng (about US$714,000) for the contract violation. Around the New York Fashion Week (in which season-one winner Huyền Trang, season-one runner-up Tuyết Lan and season-two winner Hoàng Thùy participated), Tuyết Lan was named season-one winner over actual winner Huyền Trang in an email. According to executive producer Quỳnh Trang, it was a typographical error and Huyền Trang was the winner. Hà Anh said in an interview that based on their invitations, Hoang Thuy and Tuyet Lan might not walking at the New York Fashion Week. This caused antagonism between Quỳnh Trang and fellow judge Đỗ Mạnh Cường and Hà Anh. Hà Anh accused Quỳnh Trang of rigging the show and treating Huyền Trang unfairly, saying that the Vietnamese audience was misled and neither Lan nor Thùy walked at the New York Fashion Week. Huyền Trang later confirmed that she did not receive her billion-dong modelling contract, a trip to New York for training or a VND 200 million contract with Revlon cosmetics, declaring her intention to dissolve her relationship with the show. A post on the show's Facebook page called the situation a misunderstanding, saying that Trang was in breach of contract.

Season five
In its fifth season, Vietnam's Next Top Model crowned two winners: Quang Hùng and Nguyễn Oanh. Viewer reaction was negative, with the audience considering Oanh's victory undeserved. Xuân Lan later told the press that Oanh was a worthy winner, and the producers had received approval from the format distributor for two winners. According to finale host Tùng Leo, the photos from the live photo shoot were not shown because of the venue's poor lighting.

References

External links 
 Vietnam's Next Top Model Official Site
 Application Form
List of television programmes broadcast by Vietnam Television (VTV)

 
2010s Vietnamese television series
2010 Vietnamese television series debuts
Vietnamese television series based on American television series